The 2012 Cork Intermediate Hurling Championship was the 103rd staging of the Cork Intermediate Hurling Championship since its establishment by the Cork County Board in 1909. The draw for the opening round fixtures took place on 11 December 2011. The championship began on 26 May 2012 and ended on 14 October 2012.

On 14 October 2012, Kilworth won the championship following a 2-15 to 2-13 defeat of Kanturk in the final at Páirc Uí Rinn. This was their first ever championship title.

Kilworth's Adrian Mannix was the championship's top scorer with 2-31.

Team changes

To Championship

Promoted from the Cork Junior A Hurling Championship
 Charleville

Relegated from the Cork Premier Intermediate Hurling Championship
 Argideen Rangers

From Championship

Promoted to the Cork Premier Intermediate Hurling Championship
 Bandon

Relegated to the East Cork Junior A Hurling Championship
 Cobh

Results

First round

Second round

Third round

Relegation playoff

Fourth round

Quarter-finals

Semi-finals

Final

Championship statistics

Top scorers

Overall

In a single game

References

Cork Intermediate Hurling Championship
Cork Intermediate Hurling Championship